NRK Klassisk is a digital radio channel operated by the Norwegian Broadcasting Corporation (NRK) which broadcasts classical music 24 hours a day.

History 
NRK Klassisk was launched in Oslo on 1 June 1995 as the world’s first all-digital radio station (DAB), broadcasting 24 hours a day. The BBC and Swedish Radio, which launched their first digital radio stations in September 1995, caused NRK to bring forward its plans, so as to be the first in the world to use the DAB radio standard (Eureka 147).

Right from the start, the channel was in operation 24 hours a day with a staff of six, in a totally digital programme chain from production via DAB transmitter to receiver.

For broadcasting, the channel used the software BMS (Broadcast Media Server) from the Swedish company BCC. BMS made it possible to prerecord announcements through a digital mixer, together with jingles and background atmosphere, on the computer hard disk and to manage playback together with music recordings from CD and digital audio tape (DAT). The CDs were stored in juke boxes that held 360 each. Each juke box had two players, and when fully developed, NRK Klassisk had ten such juke boxes.

Present operation 

NRK Klassisk staff broadcast morning programmes live. For the rest of the day and night, the system is programmed in shifts, so that the playlists are broadcast automatically. During holidays like Christmas and Easter, the broadcast of automatic playlists can go on for several days. Transmits at 80k/bits DAB+ on regional DAB networks.

External links
NRK Klassisk - schedule (in Norwegian)
NRK internet radio guide (in Norwegian)
NRK Klassisk (Internet radio)

NRK
Radio stations in Norway
Radio stations established in 1995
1995 establishments in Norway
Articles containing video clips